Rob Verlinden (Laren, 30 August 1950) is a Dutch gardener, television presenter of gardening shows and writer of several gardening books.

Biography 
Verlinden was brought up with gardening and in 1974 he succeeded his father in the family gardening shop. In 1986 Verlinden started his television career working on the show Avro's Service Salon. In 1992 he switched to RTL 4 and started the program Flora Magazine which was broadcast for two seasons. In 1993/1994 "Flora Magazine" was combined with the do-it-yourself show Eigen Huis (own home), by handyman Nico Zwinkels, into the program Eigen Huis en Tuin (own home and garden). Verlinden and Zwinkels switched to SBS 6 in 2004. The program they had planned did however never start, due to Zwinkels being found unfit due to lawsuits against him. Verlinden supported his friend, but eventually decided to continue on his own with a new program De Tuinruimers (the gardencleaners).

Rob also has a weekly column in Tros Kompas and Algemeen Dagblad, and is on the radio every day on the show Meteo Consult tuinweerbericht (Meteo Consult garden weather forecasting ).

Personal 
Verlinden was married and has two children and seven grandchildren. He came out during his marriage, which ended in a divorce.

TV programs 
 Avro's Service Salon (AVRO, 1986 – 1992)
 Flora Magazine (RTL 4, 1992 – 1993) with Anniko van Santen
 Eigen Huis en Tuin (RTL 4, 1993 – 2004) with Nico Zwinkels
 Robs tuinreizen (RTL 4, 2003)
 Kerst met Rudolph en Rob (RTL 4, 2003 – 2004) with Rudolph van Veen
 De Tuinruimers (SBS 6, 2004 – 2010)
 Robs grote tuinverbouwing (SBS 6, 2010 – 2018)

Books 
 Tuinieren met gevoel (2005)
 De tuinruimers (2006)

References

External links 
  Column of Rob Verlinden on Goedenwel.nl
 

1950 births
Living people
People from Laren, North Holland
Dutch television presenters
Dutch LGBT entertainers
Dutch LGBT broadcasters